Sir John Joseph Grinlinton was a member of the Legislative Council of Ceylon. He was knighted by letters patent in 1894.

References 

Knights Bachelor
Year of birth missing
Year of death missing
Members of the Legislative Council of Ceylon
People from British Ceylon